The 2016–17 season  was the 45th edition of the National Basketball League of England. Northumbria University won their 1st league title.

NBL1

Regular season

Playoffs

Quarter-finals

Semi-finals

Final

NBL2

Regular season

NBL3

North Division

South Division

Playoffs

Quarter-finals

Semi-finals

Final

NBL4

North

Midlands

South East

South West

First round

Quarter-finals

Semi-finals

Final

References

English Basketball League seasons
English
English
Basketball
Basketball